Roger Gaston Giran  (12 February 1892 – 26 April 1944) was a French rower who had his best results in the double sculls, together with Alfred Plé. In 1920 they won the European title and a bronze Olympic medal.

References

1892 births
1944 deaths
French male rowers
Olympic bronze medalists for France
Olympic rowers of France
Rowers at the 1920 Summer Olympics
Olympic medalists in rowing
Medalists at the 1920 Summer Olympics
European Rowing Championships medalists
20th-century French people